The 1985 UCI Road World Championships took place on 1 September 1985 in Giavera del Montello, Italy.

Results

Medal table

External links 
 Men's results
 Women's results
  Results at sportpro.it

 
UCI Road World Championships by year
Road World Championships 1985
1985 in road cycling
Uci Road World Championships, 1985
UCI Road World Championships, 1985